Bikramjit Goswami Memorial College is a college at Jaypur in Purulia district. It offers undergraduate courses in arts. It is affiliated to Sidho Kanho Birsha University.

Departments

Arts
Bengali
English
History
Geography
Political Science

See also

References

External links
Bikramjit Goswami Memorial College
Sidho Kanho Birsha University
University Grants Commission
National Assessment and Accreditation Council

Colleges affiliated to Sidho Kanho Birsha University
Academic institutions formerly affiliated with the University of Burdwan
Universities and colleges in Purulia district
Educational institutions established in 2009
2009 establishments in West Bengal